Pitt Meadows—Maple Ridge is a federal electoral district in British Columbia. It encompasses a portion of British Columbia previously included in the electoral district of Pitt Meadows—Maple Ridge—Mission.

Pitt Meadows—Maple Ridge was created by the 2012 federal electoral boundaries redistribution and was legally defined in the 2013 representation order. It came into effect upon the call of the 2015 Canadian federal election, which took place on October 19, 2015.

Demographics

Members of Parliament
This riding has elected the following members of the House of Commons of Canada:

Election results

Pitt Meadows–Maple Ridge–Mission

Notes

References

British Columbia federal electoral districts
Federal electoral districts in Greater Vancouver and the Fraser Valley
Maple Ridge, British Columbia
Mission, British Columbia
Pitt Meadows